Jason Kincaid is an American professional wrestler best known for his time in Evolve,  Dramatic Dream Team (DDT) in Japan and Ring Of Honor. He is also known for competing on the United States independent scene and within the National Wrestling Alliance, where he is the former NWA World Junior Heavyweight Champion.

Professional wrestling career

Independent circuit (2003–present)
In 2003, Jason Kincaid began training as a wrestler under Scotty McKeever, but would start more hands on training with The Batten Twins not long after, and debuted in May 2003, in Oak Hill, West Virginia, against TJ Phillips. During his first few years of active competition, Kincaid would travel across West Virginia, Ohio, Tennessee, North Carolina, and Pennsylvania wrestling for various independent promotions including Southern States Wrestling, George South's Exodus Wrestling Alliance, and Ted Dibiase's Power Wrestling Alliance. On August 8, 2007, he competed against AJ Styles in a losing effort in Dunbar, West Virginia on for Mega Pro Wrestling. At IWA East Coast's Stiff Competition 2 event, on July 12, 2011, in Nitro, West Virginia, he challenged heavyweight champion Chris Hero only to come up short after a Cyclone Kill kick to the head. On August 4, 2011, in Kingsport, Tennessee for NWA Smoky Mountain Kincaid defeated Kyle O'Reilly via pinfall after hitting the JK47. Two months later, at Remix Pro Wrestling's Throwdown For The Pound 4 event, on October 11, 2011, Kincaid pinned Jimmy Jacobs after hitting a piledriver. On New Year's Day 2012, Kincaid pinned Johnny Gargano with a victory roll at an American Pro Wrestling Alliance event in Clarksburg, West Virginia. Kincaid battled Davey Richards to a no contest, after members of Richard's Team Ambition interfered, on August 4, 2012, in Kingsport, Tennessee for NWA Smoky Mountain. Kincaid would go on to score a pinfall victory over Chuck Taylor in Corbin, Kentucky on April 20, 2013, for Pro Wrestling Freedom. Kincaid was able to pick up a pinfall victory over Matt Hardy in Summersville, West Virginia on June 2, 2013, for 304 Wrestling. On March 7, 2014, Kincaid defeated Lance Hoyt in Church Hill, Tennessee, to retain the NWA Smoky Mountain Championship.

National Wrestling Alliance (2007–2017)
On October 11, 2011, in Kingsport, Tennessee Kincaid defeated Keith Knox to become the NWA Smoky Mountain champion and is currently the longest reigning champion in the National Wrestling Alliance.

After winning the opening match of a Remix Pro Wrestling event on October 6, 2012, in Marietta, Ohio, Kincaid was offered an NWA World Heavyweight Title match by champion Adam Pearce. Upon accepting the challenge Kincaid was attacked by Pearce and left lying in the ring after receiving a piledriver. That night, Kincaid would lose to Pearce via pinfall after taking a low blow and a second piledriver. On April 27, 2013, Kincaid would defeat (the now former NWA World Heavyweight Champion) Adam Pearce in a rematch via pinfall.

On August 10, 2013, at NWA Smoky Mountain's annual Fire On The Mountain event Kincaid won the NWA World Junior Heavyweight championship from Chase Owens in a Title vs Title match, with Kincaid putting the NWA Smoky Mountain Championship on the line, via pinfall. However, he lost the title on October 18, 2013.

On February 14, 2014, Kincaid defeated Chase Owens and Shawn Shultz in a Triple Title Turmoil match to become the NWA Southern Heavyweight Champion.

On December 9, 2014, Kincaid's NWA Smoky Mountain Championship was rechristened the NWA Southeastern Heavyweight Championship.

On December 27, 2014, Kincaid faced Rob Conway for the NWA World Heavyweight Title in a losing effort at the NWA Smoky Mountain Finale event. Earlier that same night he successfully defended his NWA Southern Heavyweight Championship in an impromptu match against long-standing rival Chase Owens.

On Saturday May 9, 2015, Jason Kincaid successfully defended his reign as NWA Southern Heavyweight Champion, against John Morrison at the main event of NWA Smokey Mountain's collision course in Kingsport, Tennessee.

On February 11, 2017, Kincaid's five-year reign as the NWA Southeastern Heavyweight Champion came to an end, when he lost the title to Chase Owens.

Mexico (2011)
During the fall and winter of 2011 Kincaid would travel to Mexico where he would compete in various trios (six man tag) matches. On December 18, 2011, he defeated veteran luchador Aztec to retain the NWA Smoky Mountain Championship at a Cajeme Lucha Libre event in Ciudad Obregón.

Total Nonstop Action Wrestling (2012, 2015)
On November 15, 2012 at Freedom Hall in Johnson City, Tennessee, Kincaid made his debut in Total Nonstop Action Wrestling, in a losing effort against Chase Owens. On September 15, 2015 at the Morgantown Event Center, in Morgantown, West Virginia, Kincaid returned to TNA in another losing effort to Chase Owens.

Traditional Championship Wrestling (2012–2014)
Kincaid made his debut for Traditional Championship Wrestling on August 11, 2012 in a losing effort to Sigmon. After picking up a few wins, Kincaid would go on to challenge and defeat X-Cal for the TCW Junior Heavyweight title, on September 15, 2012 in Memphis, Tennessee. At TCW's Missouri Madness Event, in Springfield, Missouri, Kincaid would lose the belt to John Saxon in a match that would spark a rivalry leading to a best of seven series. In match one of the best of seven series at TCW's Night Of The Champions event, Kincaid would defeat Saxon to regain the title and take a 1–0 series lead. On April 15, 2013 Kincaid successfully defended the TCW Junior Heavyweight Title against Brian Kendrick in Las Vegas at the Cauliflower Alley Club. One month later, at TCW's Mississippi Meltdown event John Saxon would defeat Kincaid to regain the title and tie the series 1–1. After going down 2–1 Kincaid would become a three-time TCW Junior Heavyweight Champion at TCW's Back To School Bash IV event in Fort Smith, Arkansas after a pinfall victory over Saxon. Kincaid would reclaim the TCW Junior Heavyweight Title from Americos at TCW's "Last Stand" event on November 16, 2013, in Fortsmith, Arkansas.

Canada (2014)
On May 7, 2014, Kincaid met Chris Hero in the first round of Canadian Wrestling's Elite's Elite 8 tournament, in Souris, Manitoba, in a losing effort. Kincaid scored a pinfall victory over Sonjay Dutt on October 19, 2014, in Morden, Manitoba.

Ring of Honor (2016)
On January 9, 2016, Kincaid made his debut for Ring of Honor during their Winter Warriors tour in a losing effort to Lio Rush as part of the company's annual Top Prospect Tournament. He would go on to compete for ROH several more times, that year, facing off against Donovan Dijak, A. C. H., Roderick Strong, Mark Briscoe, and others.

EVOLVE Wrestling (2016–2018)
On October 15, 2016, Kincaid debuted for EVOLVE. On December 16, 2016, EVOLVE's parent company WWNLive announced that they had signed Kincaid. As a core member of the EVOLVE roster, Kincaid has picked up wins against Caleb Konley, Sean Maluta, Dustin, and others.

WWE (2018)
Through the Evolve partnership, on May 4, 2018, Kincaid made his WWE debut at WrestleMania Axxess in New Orleans, Louisiana as an invitee in the NXT North American Title Invitational tournament, losing in the first round to Fabian Aichner.

Japan (2018-present)

On April 29, 2018, Kincaid made his debut for Dramatic Dream Team at the promotion's Max Bump 2018 event, at Korakuen Hall, in Tokyo, Japan in a winning effort alongside Mizuki Watase in tag-team action. Kincaid and Watase would join leader Shigehiro Irie's faction The Renegades, which would later include Sammy Guevara and Facade. Kincaid has gone on to tour regularly for DDT, during which time he has picked up victories over the likes of Jun Kasai, Shuji Ishikawa, and Keisuke Ishii.

Championships and accomplishments 
 304 Wrestling 
 304 Wrestling Tag Team Championship (1 time) – with Chris Richards
 All Star Wrestling (West Virginia)
 All Star Wrestling Tag Team Championship (1 time) – with Chris Richards
American Pro Wrestling Alliance 
APWA Super Junior Championship (1 time)
APWA World Tag Team Championship (1 time) - with Smokey C
 AWA Apex
 AWA Apex Shooting Star Championship (1 time)
 AWA Apex Tag Team Championship (3 times) – with Danny Ray (1), Mr. Black (1), and Flex Tolley (1)
East Coast Wrestling Association
ECWA Super 8 Tournament (2015)
Glory Pro
Crown of Glory Championship (1 time)
Crown of Glory Championship Tournament (2017)
Modern Vintage Wrestling
MVW Heavyweight Championship (2 time)
 National Wrestling Alliance
 NWA World Junior Heavyweight Championship (1 time)
 NWA Mountain State
 NWA Mountain State Feud Of The Year (2 times) – with Chuck Jones (1) and Kris King (1)
 NWA Mountain State Heavyweight Championship (1 time)
 NWA Mountain State Match Of The Year (2 time) – with Chuck Jones (1) and Kris King (1)
 NWA Mountain State Tag Team Championship (1 time) – with Eric Darkstorm
 NWA Smoky Mountain Wrestling
 NWA Southeastern Heavyweight Championship (1 time)
 NWA Smoky Mountain Tag Team Championship (1 time) – with Chris Richards
 NWA Smoky Mountain Championship (1 time)
Smoky Mountain Cup (2014)
 NWA Southern All-Star Wrestling
 NWA Southern Heavyweight Championship (1 time)
 Ohio Hatchet Wrestling
 Ohio Hatchet Heavyweight Championship (1 time)
 Primal Conflict Wrestling
PCW Tag Team Championship (1 time) - with Matt Conard
 Primal Conflict Wrestling Match of the Year (2012) – with Bobby Shields
Pro Wrestling Illustrated
PWI ranked him #231 of the top 500 singles wrestlers in the PWI 500 in 2015
 Proving Ground Pro Wrestling
 Proving Ground Pro Cutting Edge Championship (1 time, current)
 Southern States Wrestling
 Southern States Wrestling Heritage Championship (1 time)
 Traditional Championship Wrestling
 TCW Junior Heavyweight Championship (3 times)

References

External links
Jason Kincaid at Online World of Wrestling

Living people
American male professional wrestlers
People from Oak Hill, West Virginia
Sportspeople from West Virginia
Sportspeople from Honolulu
Professional wrestlers from Hawaii
Year of birth missing (living people)
21st-century professional wrestlers
NWA World Junior Heavyweight Champions